Issouf Sosso (born 11 August 1996) is a Burkinabé football defender who plays for ASFA Yennenga. He was a squad member for the 2020 African Nations Championship.

International career

International goals
Scores and results list Burkina Faso's goal tally first.

References

1996 births
Living people
Burkinabé footballers
Burkina Faso international footballers
Burkinabé Premier League players
US Ouagadougou players
ASFA Yennenga players
Association football defenders
Salitas FC players
21st-century Burkinabé people
Burkina Faso A' international footballers
2020 African Nations Championship players